Kawhia Harbour is one of three large natural inlets in the Tasman Sea coast of the Waikato region of New Zealand's North Island. It is located to the south of Raglan Harbour, Ruapuke and Aotea Harbour, 40 kilometres southwest of Hamilton. Kawhia is part of the Ōtorohanga District and is in the King Country. Te Motu Island is located in the harbour.

The settlement of Kawhia is located on the northern coast of the inlet, and was an important port in early colonial New Zealand. The area of Kawhia comprises  and is the town block that was owned by the New Zealand Government. The government bought it from the Europeans in 1880 "not from the original Māori owners, but from a European who claimed ownership in payment of money owed by another European".

History and culture

Early history

The Kawhia Harbour is the southernmost location where kauri trees historically grew.

Kawhia is known in Māori lore as the final resting-place of the ancestral waka (canoe) Tainui. Soon after arrival, captain Hoturoa made it first priority to establish a whare wananga (sacred school of learning) which was named Ahurei. Ahurei is situated at the summit of the sacred hill behind Kawhia’s seaside marae – Maketu Marae.  The harbour area was the birthplace of prominent Māori warrior chief Te Rauparaha of the Ngāti Toa tribe, who lived in the area until the 1820s, when he, and his tribe along with Ngāti Rārua and Ngāti Koata migrated southwards.

Tainui was buried at the base of Ahurei by Hoturoa himself, and other members of the iwi. Hoturoa marked out the waka with two limestone pillars which he blessed. Firstly, there is "Hani (Hani-a-te-waewae-i-kimi-atu) which is on the higher ground and marked the prow of the canoe". Marking the stern of the canoe, Hoturoa placed the symbol of Puna, the spirit-goddess of that creation story. "In full it is named Puna-whakatupu-tangata, and represents female fertility, the spring or source of humanity". It is said that a pure woman who touches this stone will be given the gift of a child, and become pregnant. There have been cases of women using Puna when they have had difficulty conceiving a child.

Marae

Maketu Marae is located next to Kawhia Harbour. The main meeting house of the marae, Auau ki te Rangi, is named after Hoturoa’s father who was a high chief (ariki) and was built and opened in 1962.

The eldest and most prestigious meeting house that was first built on Maketu Marae is Te Ruruhi (the Old Lady) which was used as the dining hall until 1986. It was replaced by a two-storey dining hall, Te Tini O Tainui, to cater for the large numbers that visit for occasions such as annual poukai, tangi and hui. The marae is affiliated with the Ngāti Maniapoto hapū of Apakura and Hikairo, and the Waikato Tainui hapū of Ngāti Mahuta and Ngāti Te Weehi.

Six other marae are also based at or near Kawhia Harbour:
 Mōkai Kainga Marae and Ko Te Mōkai meeting house is a meeting place for the Ngāti Maniapoto hapū of Apakura and Hikairo, and the Waikato Tainui hapū of Apakura.
 Mokoroa Marae and Ngā Roimata meeting house is a meeting place for the Ngāti Maniapoto hapū of Ngati Kiriwai.
 Ōkapu or Oakapu Marae and Te Kotahitanga o Ngāti Te Weehi meeting house is a meeting place for the Waikato Tainui hapū of Ngāti Mahuta and Ngāti Te Weehi.
 Te Māhoe Marae is a meeting ground for the Ngāti Maniapoto hapū of Peehi, Te Kanawa, Te Urupare and Uekaha.
 Waipapa Marae and Ngā Tai Whakarongorua and Takuhiahia meeting houses are a meeting place for the Ngāti Maniapoto hapū of Hikairo, and the Waikato Tainui hapū of Ngāti Hikairo and Ngāti Puhiawe.
Rākaunui Marae and Moana Kahakore meeting house is a meeting place for the Ngāti Maniapoto hapū of Ngāti Ngutu, Ngāti Te Kiriwai, Ngāti Paretekawa and the Waikato Tainui hapū Ngāti Apakura.

In October 2020, the Government committed $196,684 from the Provincial Growth Fund to upgrade Ōkapu Marae, creating 16 jobs.

European history 
The Kawhia Harbour area was important to the kauri gum trade of the late 19th/early 20th centuries, as it was the southernmost area where the gum could be found.

The Kawhia Settler and Raglan Advertiser was established in May 1901 by William Murray Thompson and Thomas Elliott Wilson, who also ran the Bruce Herald, Waimate Times, Egmont Settler (later briefly part of Taranaki Central Press at Stratford) and the Mangaweka Settler. From 1909 Edward Henry Schnackenberg, whose father was a missionary here from 1858 to 1864, owned the paper, until it closed in April 1936.

In January 2018, the health board issued a statement that there was no additional risk from tuberculosis in Kawhia after reports of three possible cases.

Demographics 
The settlement is part of the larger Pirongia Forest statistical area.

Kawhia had a population of 384 at the 2018 New Zealand census, an increase of 45 people (13.3%) since the 2013 census, and a decrease of 6 people (−1.5%) since the 2006 census. There were 162 households, comprising 198 males and 186 females, giving a sex ratio of 1.06 males per female, with 66 people (17.2%) aged under 15 years, 51 (13.3%) aged 15 to 29, 147 (38.3%) aged 30 to 64, and 120 (31.2%) aged 65 or older.

Ethnicities were 55.5% European/Pākehā, 57.0% Māori, 5.5% Pacific peoples, 1.6% Asian, and 1.6% other ethnicities. People may identify with more than one ethnicity.

Although some people chose not to answer the census's question about religious affiliation, 46.1% had no religion, 37.5% were Christian, 7.0% had Māori religious beliefs and 1.6% had other religions.

Of those at least 15 years old, 39 (12.3%) people had a bachelor's or higher degree, and 99 (31.1%) people had no formal qualifications. 18 people (5.7%) earned over $70,000 compared to 17.2% nationally. The employment status of those at least 15 was that 81 (25.5%) people were employed full-time, 69 (21.7%) were part-time, and 21 (6.6%) were unemployed.

Before 2018, Kawhia was in its own statistical area

In 2013 231 dwellings were unoccupied. In the much wider Pirongia Forest area 396 dwellings were unoccupied in 2018, when it was estimated that 70% of Kawhia's houses were holiday homes.

As of 2017, New Zealand's median centre of population is located around one kilometre off the coast of Kawhia.

Pirongia Forest statistical area

Pirongia Forest which includes Pirongia Forest Park had a population of 966 at the 2018 New Zealand census, an increase of 138 people (16.7%) since the 2013 census, and an increase of 69 people (7.7%) since the 2006 census. There were 393 households, comprising 498 males and 468 females, giving a sex ratio of 1.06 males per female. The median age was 50.5 years (compared with 37.4 years nationally), with 189 people (19.6%) aged under 15 years, 117 (12.1%) aged 15 to 29, 417 (43.2%) aged 30 to 64, and 243 (25.2%) aged 65 or older.

Ethnicities were 64.3% European/Pākehā, 46.9% Māori, 3.1% Pacific peoples, 1.6% Asian, and 1.2% other ethnicities. People may identify with more than one ethnicity.

The percentage of people born overseas was 6.8, compared with 27.1% nationally.

Although some people chose not to answer the census's question about religious affiliation, 54.0% had no religion, 31.4% were Christian, 3.7% had Māori religious beliefs and 1.6% had other religions.

Of those at least 15 years old, 81 (10.4%) people had a bachelor's or higher degree, and 246 (31.7%) people had no formal qualifications. The median income was $19,700, compared with $31,800 nationally. 60 people (7.7%) earned over $70,000 compared to 17.2% nationally. The employment status of those at least 15 was that 270 (34.7%) people were employed full-time, 141 (18.1%) were part-time, and 39 (5.0%) were unemployed.

Te Puia Hot Springs 

2 hours either side of low tide (for tide times see tide-forecast.com) about 100m of the Tasman Sea beach, 4 km from Kawhia (see 1:50,000 map), oozes hot water, which can be formed into shallow bathing pools with a spade.

A council sample taken on 30 March 2006 listed these in the water.

Kawhia County Council 

Kawhia County Council was formed in 1905 and first met on 12 July 1905. New offices were built by Buchanan Bros in 1915-16 over the former beach, and designed by Hamilton architects and engineers, Warren and Blechynden. Kawhia Town Board was formed in 1906, with an area of 470 acres (190 ha). Its population in 1923 was 195, when it had 6 mi 14 ch (9.9 km) of streets and a 10 acres (4.0 ha) domain. The County merged into Ōtorohanga and Waitomo in 1956, after a Local Government Commission inquiry.

Kāwhia Community Board 
The Community Board meets monthly and consists of 4 members, plus the Kāwhia - Tihiroa Ward councillor. Three members are elected from the Kawhia area and one from Aotea.

Pou Maumahara 
Te Kuiti Stewart began carving it in 2014, from a Pureora Forest totara. It represents 150 years of Kingitanga on one side and the Elizabeth Henrietta's 1824 arrival, on the other. At night it is floodlit, with coloured LED lights inside.

Hospital 
Kawhia hospital overlooked the town, on the site of Te Puru pa, which became the Armed Constabulary redoubt in 1863. Like the County Office, the hospital was also designed by Warren and Blechynden and opened in 1918. It was still a cottage hospital in 1948, but had become a maternity hospital by 1959 and closed in March 1967.

Education

Kawhia School is a Year 1–8 co-educational state primary school.

Notable people 
 Te Rangihaeata, chief, born about 1780
 John Kent, European trader, 1820s–1830s
 John Whiteley, Cort and Annie Jane Schnackenberg, missionaries
 Hoana Riutoto, signatory of Treaty of Waitangi
 Jim Rukutai, rugby player, born about 1877
 Mary Reidy, sister at Kawhia Hospital 1921-1947
 Carole Shepheard (born 1945), artist

See also 

 SH31
 Kairuku waewaeroa, extinct giant penguin

References

External links 

 
 1911 map of Kawhia County

Ōtorohanga District
Geography of Waikato
Ports and harbours of New Zealand
Kauri gum